The Kasia 100, Kasia 170, and Kasia 2 x 100 are Polish off-route anti-vehicle mines. The mines consist of a warhead, and are mounted on a four-legged metal frame. The warheads are either 100 or 170 millimeters in diameter. A number of interchangeable warheads provide different effects:

 Misznay Schardin effect single fragment
 Misznay Schardin effect with multiple fragments
 Ball bearing fragmentation
 Combination

The Kasia 100 warhead can penetrate up to 70 millimeters of armour; the Kasia 170, 119 millimeters. The Kasia 2 x 100 variant uses two Kasia 100 warheads on a single frame.

References
 Jane's Mines and Mine Clearance 2005-2006

Anti-tank mines
Land mines of Poland